Zaseyev is a surname. Notable people with the surname include:

Alan Zaseyev (born 1982), Russian footballer
Alen Zaseyev (born 1988), South Ossetia-born Ukrainian wrestler
Azamat Zaseyev (born 1988), Russian footballer
Gela Zaseyev (born 1993), Russian footballer